Last Alaska Moon is an album by Livingston Taylor released by Coconut Bay, a division of Chesky Records, in 2010. The album was very well received.

Track listing
 Last Alaska Moon (Livingston Taylor) - 3:12
 Everybody's Just Like Me (Livingston Taylor) - 3:05 	
Henry (Livingston Taylor) - 3:04 	
 I'm Letting the Whiskey Do My Talking (Livingston Taylor) - 4:05
 The Girl Is Mine (Michael Jackson) - 3:56 	
 Kitty Hawk (Livingston Taylor) - 3:43
Never Lose Hope (Livingston Taylor) - 3:04
 Christmas Is Almost Here (Livingston Taylor) - 3:17
 Answer My Prayer (Livingston Taylor, Carole Bayer Sager) - 4:02 	
I'm in a Pickle (Livingston Taylor) - 3:15
 Walk Until It's Heaven (Livingston Taylor) - 3:26
 Call Me Carolina (Livingston Taylor) - 5:34

References

External links
 
 
 Amazon.com

2010 albums
Livingston Taylor albums